Gustaf Nilsson (2 March 1899 – 26 January 1980) was a Swedish wrestler. He competed in the Greco-Roman lightweight event at the 1920 Summer Olympics.

References

External links
 

1899 births
1980 deaths
Olympic wrestlers of Sweden
Wrestlers at the 1920 Summer Olympics
Swedish male sport wrestlers
People from Landskrona Municipality
Sportspeople from Skåne County
20th-century Swedish people